727 Naval Air Squadron is a squadron of the Royal Navy Fleet Air Arm. It was formed in 1943 as a Fleet Requirements Unit, being disbanded in December 1944.  It was reformed twice in the 1940s and 1950s to provide flying experience for naval officers.  The current squadron was created on 6 Dec 2001 from the Royal Naval Flying Training Flight. It operates the Grob Tutor, with its primary role to provide grading and legacy-Elementary Flying Training for Royal Navy and Royal Marine pilots under training. It also supports the Royal Navy's "Flying Start" flying scholarship scheme.

History of 727 NAS

Fleet Requirements Unit (1943 - 1944)
727 Naval Air Squadron was formed on 26 May 1943 at Gibraltar as a Fleet Requirements Unit covering the area from Bizerta to Algiers. The squadron was equipped with target-towing Boulton Paul Defiants, Fairey Swordfish and Hawker Hurricane IIc.  The squadron was disbanded on 7 December 1944.

Air Experience Unit (1946 - 1960)
After World War II it was decided to provide air acquaint courses for junior Royal Navy and Royal Marines officers who were not aviation specialists.  727 NAS was reformed on 23 April 1946 at RNAS Lee-on-Solent with gliders, Tiger Moths, Supermarine Seafires, North American Harvards and a Fairey Firefly.  Disbanded on 17 January 1950, the squadron was reformed on 4 January 1956 as the Dartmouth Cadet Air Training Squadron.  Now operating from RNAS Brawdy, Pembrokeshire, the squadron flew Boulton Paul Sea Balliols, De Havilland Sea Vampire T22s and a Percival Sea Prince T.1.  Two Westland Dragonfly helicopters were provided in September 1958, but the squadron was disbanded on 16 December 1960.

History of the Royal Naval Flying Training Flight
Since 1949 the Britannia Royal Naval College at Dartmouth has operated light aircraft for recreational flying, as well as running summer flying camps.  Types flown have included De Havilland Tiger Moths, Auster and De Havilland Chipmunk. Miles Messenger and Miles Gemini aircraft were also introduced. After grading of potential aircrew was introduced, these aircraft were employed during the week for assessing future aircrew and at weekends for recreation.  By this time the aircraft were based at Roborough Airport, on the outskirts of Plymouth. By 1966 the flight had been stabilised at 12 Chipmunk aircraft.

Commissioning the RNFTF as 727 NAS (2001 - present)
On 6 December 2001 the Royal Naval Flying Training Flight was commissioned as 727 Naval Air Squadron, at Plymouth City Airport, initially with the de Havilland Chipmunk and later with the Grob Tutor, and in January 2007 the squadron relocated to RNAS Yeovilton. The commissioning ceremony was attended by an original pilot member of 727, Geoffrey Harrington, who served with 727 in North Africa during WW2.

Current role
The squadron currently operates five Grob Tutor trainer aircraft under a private finance initiative with Babcock International's aerospace division. This, along with five Qualified Flying Instructors (QFIs), allow up to ten students to be accommodated with the squadron at any time.

Grading

Pre-selected prospective pilots are assessed for their suitability to continue flight training. During Flying Grading, they fly a twelve hour syllabus with an instructor before flying a pre-FHT with a different instructor and then a Final Handling Test (FHT) with the Squadron Commanding Officer.

The aim of the FHT is to fly the aircraft unassisted whilst being assessed on complete Departure, Climb, Level Off, Turns, Stall, Spin, Aerobatics, Recovery and 3 Circuits (a Standard, Glide and Flapless circuit). If the student performs well  with only limited prompting in the FHT then he will pass; The FHT is designed to assess the pilots rate of progress and temperament to ensure it matches the fast pace of further training.

Successful pilots continue their flying training with 703 Naval Air Squadron at RAF Barkston Heath, whilst those unsuccessful are rebranched for other duties within the Royal Navy and have the choice to resign from training.

Special Flying Award

The squadron also undertakes many other roles, one of which is the Special Flying Award. This scheme is open to any member of the public who has expressed an interest in joining the Fleet Air Arm as aircrew and have been put forward by their Careers Office. The course lasts for two weeks with the aim of 10 hours in the cockpit. There are also a number of Special Flying Awards organised for members of the URNU and the CCF.

Elementary Flying Training

727 also accommodates students who undertake Elementary Flying Training on the Tutor, which sees them complete a course similar to the legacy EFT, still being undertaken by 16 Squadron at RAF Wittering.

The Squadron Today

The squadron currently has just two full-time Naval personnel; the commanding officer and the training officer. Babcock employs five civilian flying instructors under their contract to teach the students. The squadron is also supported by a number of ex-service QFIs from the RNR to instruct and two holdover student pilots who are between flying training courses bound for general duties.

Maintenance of the Grob fleet is provided by a Babcock senior licensed engineer with three engineering support staff. An aircraft handler provides aircraft handling, refuelling and assistance to aircrew.
The squadron moved from Plymouth Airport to RNAS Yeovilton in early 2007, following the departure of the last Sea Harrier squadron from RNAS Yeovilton in 2006.

Aircraft flown
Since 1943, 727 NAS and the Royal Naval Flying Training Flight have flown a wide variety of aircraft:

Boulton Paul Defiant
Fairey Swordfish
Hawker Hurricane IIc
Boulton Paul Sea Balliol
De Havilland Sea Vampire T22
Percival Sea Prince T1
Westland Dragonfly
Tiger Moth
Auster
De Havilland Chipmunk
Miles Messenger
Miles Gemini
Grob Tutor T1

References

External links
Official Website

700 series Fleet Air Arm squadrons
Air squadrons of the Royal Navy in World War II